The third season of the Australian police-drama Blue Heelers premiered on the Seven Network on 12 February 1996 and aired on Monday nights, and later Tuesday nights, at 8:30 PM. The 42-episode season concluded 26 November 1996.

Casting
Main cast for this season consisted of:
 John Wood as Sergeant Tom Croydon [full season]
 Julie Nihill as Christine 'Chris' Riley [full season]
 Martin Sacks as Senior Detective Patrick Joseph 'P.J.' Hasham [full season]
 Lisa McCune as Constable Margaret 'Maggie' Doyle [full season]
 William McInnes as Senior Constable Nicholas 'Nick' Schultz [full season]
 Grant Bowler as Constable Wayne Patterson [until episode 96]
 Damian Walshe-Howling as Constable Adam Cooper [full season]
 Tasma Walton as Probationary Constable Deirdre 'Dash' McKinley [episode 107+]

Semi-regular cast members for this season include:
 Peta Doodson as Senior Sergeant Monica Draper
 Beth Buchanan as Susan Croydon
 Michael Isaacs as Clancy Freeman
 Axl Taylor as Len the barman
 Dennis Miller as Ex-Sergeant Pat Doyle
 Nick Waters as Inspector Ted Faulkner
 Helen Trenos as Celia Donald
 Stuart Baker as "Richo"
 Reg Evans as Keith Purvis
 Terry Gill as Chief Superintendent Clive Adamson
 Karen Davitt as Dr. Zoe Hamilton
 Rachel Blakely as Gina Belfanti
 Beverley Evans as Harriet Keppel
 Alexandra Sangster as Anna Croydon
 Don Bridges as Charlie Clarke
 Marie Trevor as Lelia Clegg
 Pauline Terry-Bietz as Beth McKinley
 Frankie J. Holden as Senior Detective Jack Woodley

Notable guest stars included Frances O'Connor, Marg Downey, Lee Kernaghan, Radha Mitchell, Terry Gill, Raelee Hill, Louise Siversen, Rhys Muldoon, David Wenham, Norman Yemm, Andrew Blackman, Frankie J. Holden, Anne Phelan, Annie Jones, Asher Keddie, and Andrew McKaige.

With Grant Bowler's exit from the show, Ann Burbrook also returned to Blue Heelers to temporarily reprise her role as Roz Patterson.

Awards

Episodes

DVD release

References

General
 Zuk, T. Blue Heelers: 1996 episode guide, Australian Television Information Archive. Retrieved 1 August 2007.
 TV.com editors. Blue Heelers Episode Guide – Season 3, TV.com. Retrieved 1 August 2007.
Specific

Blue Heelers seasons
1996 Australian television seasons